Abortion in Arizona is currently legal for up to 15 weeks gestation.

As a territory, Arizona originally banned abortion in 1864, and although it became unenforceable after the decision in Roe v. Wade, the law has remained on the books ever since. The enforcement of the total ban was prevented by an injunction in the 1973 case Nelson v. Planned Parenthood, which based its decision solely on Roe. The Dobbs v. Jackson Women's Health Organization decision overturned Roe. The injunction, which was lifted on September 23, 2022, by a superior court judge in Pima County, was temporarily reinstated by the Arizona Court of Appeals on October 7, 2022. On December 30, 2022, the Arizona Court of Appeals ruled that the criminal penalties of the 1864 law could not be enforced.

In a 2014 poll by Pew Research Center, 49% of Arizona adults said that abortion should be legal in all or most cases with 47% saying it should be illegal in all or most cases. In a 2022 poll of 938 registered Arizona voters by OH Predictive Insights, 87% said they wanted abortion to remain legal in all or some cases.

By 1950, abortion was a criminal offense in Arizona. In April 2012, abortion after 20 weeks of pregnancy became illegal in Arizona; however, its enforcement was permanently blocked under an injunction. Targeted Regulation of Abortion Providers (TRAP) existed by 2013. The total number of abortion clinics in Arizona have been declining for years, going from thirty-seven in 1982 to twenty-eight in 1992 to nine in 2014. In 2014, there were 12,914 abortions in the state. The next year, there were 12,644 abortions. In 2010, there were fourteen publicly funded abortions in the state. Abortion and religion have intersected in the state, particularly in the case of Sr. Margaret Mary McBride, R.S.M., a Sister of Mercy. The state has an active abortion rights community, with women participating in #StoptheBans movement in May 2019.

History

Territorial origins 
Arizona's first ban on abortion was passed as part of the 1864 Howell Code, a year after the formation of the Arizona Territory (Arizona would not become a state until 1912). It read:“[E]very person who shall administer or cause to be administered or taken, any medicinal substances, or shall use or cause to be used any instruments whatever, with the intention to procure the miscarriage of any woman then being with child, and shall be thereof duly convicted, shall be punished by imprisonment in the Territorial prison for a term not less than two years nor more than five years: Provided, that no physician shall be affected by the last clause of this section, who in the discharge of his professional duties, deems it necessary to produce the miscarriage of any woman in order to save her life.” Physicians, however, were arrested for performing abortions. In the 19th century, bans by state legislatures on abortion were about protecting the life of the mother given the number of deaths caused by abortions; state governments saw themselves as looking out for the lives of their citizens. By 1950, the state legislature would pass a law that stating that a woman who had an abortion or actively sought to have an abortion regardless of whether she went through with it were guilty of a criminal offense.

Roe v. Wade 
The US Supreme Court's decision in 1973's Roe v. Wade ruling meant the state could no longer regulate abortion in the first trimester. Despite the U.S. Ninth Circuit Court of Appeals overturning Arizona's April 2012 abortion law in January 2015, the law banning abortion remains on the books.

By 1973, when Roe v. Wade was decided, Arizona's abortion law A.R.S. § 13-3603 fully banned all abortions with prison time:A person who provides, supplies or administers to a pregnant woman, or procures such woman to take any medicine, drugs or substance, or uses or employs any instrument or other means whatever, with intent thereby to procure the miscarriage of such woman, unless it is necessary to save her life, shall be punished by imprisonment in the state prison for not less than two years nor more than five years.§ 13-3603 was declared unconstitutional in 1973, in Nelson v. Planned Parenthood. The case was initially heard in 1972, when it declared the law constitutional. Only the decision in Roe changed the court's decision, in a brief rehearing in 1973. But the Arizona legislature never struck the law from the books.

As part of the statutes around abortion clinic regulations in Arizona and Florida that existed in 2007, there is a requirement that abortion providers show women ultrasounds of their fetus before they are allowed to have an abortion. Governor Jan Brewer signed into law in April 2012 abortion restrictions that prohibited the procedure after 20 weeks. In 2013, state Targeted Regulation of Abortion Providers (TRAP) law applied to medication induced abortions and private doctor offices. In 2018, the state legislature passed a law that required the Arizona Health Department to apply for Title X funds as part of their attempts to defund Planned Parenthood.

Arizona law requires that only medical doctors can perform abortions as of 2019. Women have a mandated 24 hour waiting period after seeking an abortion and must undergo in person state mandated counseling. On January 1, 2019, a new law came into force in Arizona that required women to provide detailed medical information that was to be submitted to the state before they were allowed to have an abortion. Among the information the new law required abortion providers to collect was whether the abortion was elective or therapeutic, the number of abortions they have had in the past and information on any medical complications they have as a result of the abortion. This information is then collected by Department of Health Services who provide the state with an annual report on abortions in the state, along with information on the how abortions are paid for in the state. In 2019, women in Arizona were eligible for pregnancy related disability associated medical care that included abortion or miscarriage.

As of May 14, 2019, abortion was legally not allowed after the fetus was viable, generally some point between week 24 and 28. This period uses a standard defined by the US Supreme Court in 1973 with the Roe v. Wade ruling and not state law. On May 21, 2019, HB 2759 was introduced by Republican Representative Michelle Udall in Arizona's House with 20 other co-sponsors to provide $2.5 million annually for a period of three years to create a pilot program run by Texas anti-abortion organization Human Coalition with a purpose "to encourage healthy childbirth [and] support childbirth as an alternative to abortion." The proposed legislation also said funds for this program "may not be used for abortion referral services or distributed to entities that promote, refer or perform abortions."

Dobbs v. Jackson Women's Health Organization 
The passing of Senate Bill 1164 in March 2022, combined with the overturning of Roe in Dobbs v. Jackson Women's Health Organization, will restrict abortions to before 15 weeks of viability. S.B. 1164 will go into effect 90 days after the legislative session ends on June 30. But S.B. 1164 may not control abortion in its entirety given that § , which bans abortion entirely, is still on the books. These "dueling" laws are expected to lead to a legal challenge, or a special session of the legislature.

Clinic history 

Between 1982 and 1992, the number of abortion clinics in the state decreased by 9, going from 37 in 1982 to 28 in 1992. In 2014, there were 9 abortion clinics in the state. 80% of the counties in the state did not have an abortion clinic. That year, 19% of women in the state aged 15–44 lived in a county without an abortion clinic. In 2019, 80% of counties in Arizona did not have a clinic that provided abortion services. This made it very difficult for most women in Arizona who wanted abortions to get one. In 2019, Northern Arizona was served by only one clinic that performed abortions, and that was a Planned Parenthood clinic which could only provide induced abortions using medication. In 2017, there were 10 Planned Parenthood clinics, of which 4 offered abortion services, in a state with a population of 1,525,996 women aged 15–49.

Statistics 
In the period between 1972 and 1974, there were zero recorded illegal abortion deaths in the state. In 1990, 448,000 women in the state faced the risk of an unintended pregnancy. In 2001, Arizona, Florida, Iowa, Louisiana, Massachusetts, and Wisconsin did not provide any residence related data regarding abortions performed in the state to the Centers for Disease Control. In 2014, 49% of adults said in a poll by the Pew Research Center that abortion should be legal in all or most cases, and 47% said it should be illegal in all or most cases. In 2017, the state had an infant mortality rate of 5.7 deaths per 1,000 live births.

Abortion financing 
17 states including Arizona use their own funds to cover all or most "medically necessary" abortions sought by low-income women under Medicaid, 13 of which are required by State court orders to do so. In 2010, the state had fourteen publicly funded abortions, of which one was federally and thirteen were state funded. In March 2019, Arizona Family Health Partnership was the primary association to receive the state's Title X funds.  Planned Parenthood received around 17% of these funds while serving around 53% of all Title IX recipients.

Intersections with religion 

Margaret Mary McBride, is a Sister of Mercy.  McBride was an administrator and member of the ethics committee at St. Joseph's Hospital and Medical Center, which is owned by Catholic Healthcare West (Dignity Health).  On November 27, 2009, the committee was consulted on the case of a 27-year-old woman who was eleven weeks pregnant with her fifth child and suffering from pulmonary hypertension. Her doctors stated that the woman's chance of dying if the pregnancy was allowed to continue was "close to 100 percent". McBride joined the ethics committee in approving the decision to terminate the pregnancy through an induced abortion. The abortion took place and the mother survived.

Afterwards, the abortion came to the attention of Bishop Thomas J. Olmsted, the bishop of the Catholic Diocese of Phoenix. Olmsted spoke to McBride privately and she confirmed her participation in the procurement of the abortion. Olmsted informed her that in allowing the abortion, she had incurred a latae sententiae, or automatic, excommunication. McBride was subsequently reassigned from her post as vice president of mission integration at the hospital.

In December 2010, Olmsted announced that the Roman Catholic Diocese of Phoenix was severing its affiliation with the hospital, after months of discussion had failed to obtain from the hospital management a promise not to perform abortions in the future. "If we are presented with a situation in which a pregnancy threatens a woman's life, our first priority is to save both patients. If that is not possible, we will always save the life we can save, and that is what we did in this case," said hospital president Linda Hunt. "Morally, ethically, and legally, we simply cannot stand by and let someone die whose life we might be able to save."

Abortion rights views and activities

Protests 
Women from the state participated in marches supporting abortion rights as part of a #StoptheBans movement in May 2019. On May 21, 2019, large number of women protested abortion laws passed in other states outside the Arizona Capitol building.

Activists

Sherri Finkbine 
One notable case dealt with a woman named Sherri Finkbine. Born in the area of Phoenix, Arizona, Finkbine had four healthy children. However, during her pregnancy with her fifth child, she had found that the child might have severe deformities. Finkbine had been taking sleeping pills that contained a drug called thalidomide which was also very popular in several countries. She had later learned that the drug was causing fetal deformities and she wanted to warn the general public. Finkbine strongly wanted an abortion; however, the abortion laws of Arizona limited her decision. In Arizona, an abortion could only occur if the mother's life was in danger. She met with a reporter from The Arizona Republic and told her story. While Sherri Finkbine wanted to be kept anonymous, the reporter disregarded this idea. On August 18, 1962, Finkbine traveled to Sweden where she was able to obtain a legal abortion. It was also confirmed that the child would have been severely deformed.

Footnotes

References 

Arizona
Healthcare in Arizona
Women in Arizona